Callispa minima, is a species of leaf beetle found in Sri Lanka.

Description
Body length is about 3.60 mm. Body oblong. Head bluish black with minutely punctured vertex. Eyes are ovate. Antennae brownish, thin and short and about 1.40 mm long. In the prothorax, convex portion is shiny and bluish black, whereas lateral parts are pale brownish. Remaining part of prothorax shiny and greenish black. Prothorax length is 0.80 mm. Scutellum pentagonal. Elytra has some faint brownish spots closer to the humeral callus. Elytral length is about  2.80 mm. Legs, and ventrum are brownish. Abdomen pale brown.

References 

Cassidinae
Insects of Sri Lanka
Beetles described in 1902